Pawthereum (ticker: PAWTH) is a decentralized, animal welfare–focused cryptocurrency created in October 2021, running on the Ethereum network. A percentage of every transaction goes to a charity wallet, and an additional percentage goes back to token holders in the form of reflections.

History 
The Pawthereum Foundation (also known as Stichting Pawthereum) was formed in the Netherlands. Pawthereum is a fork of another meme coin, GRUMPY, based on Grumpy Cat. In March 2021, the Grumpy Cat Coin project donated $70,000 in crypto funds to Sterling Animal Shelter. GRUMPY was converted into Pawthereum after a lawsuit by the owners of Grumpy Cat.

Notable donations 
Notable donations include 26 ETH, valued at around $120,000 at the time, to Edinburgh Dog and Cat Home. Another was $50,000 to Four Paws USA, done as a matching donation on Giving Tuesday (November 30, 2021). The project made a donation valued at $50,000 to Catherine Violet Hubbard Animal Sanctuary.

As of July 2022, Pawthereum and its partners have raised $576,200 for animal welfare–focused charities, with $478,700 being donated directly by the Pawthereum team.

Endorsement by Kevin O'Leary 
Canadian businessman and entrepreneur Kevin O'Leary has repeatedly endorsed the project, praising Pawtherem's utility for charitable giving that goes beyond simply being a meme coin.

References 

Cryptocurrency projects